Zanola aegina is a moth in the family Apatelodidae. It was described by Caspar Stoll in 1782. It is found in Suriname.

References

Apatelodidae
Moths described in 1782
Taxa named by Caspar Stoll